SDS may refer to:

Organizations

Businesses
 Samsung SDS, formerly Samsung Data Systems
 Scientific Data Systems, a 1960s computer manufacturer, later called Xerox Data Systems
 Siberian Business Union, a Russian holding company
 Seamless Distribution Systems, a Swedish software company

Political organizations
 Sayuz na Demokratichnite Sili, a political party in Bulgaria
 Slovenska demokratska stranka (Slovenian Democratic Party), formerly the Social Democratic Party of Slovenia
 Sozialistischer Deutscher Studentenbund (Socialist German Student League), West Germany, 1960s
 Serb Democratic Party (Bosnia and Herzegovina)
 Serb Democratic Party (Croatia)
 Social Democratic Party (Serbia) (Socijaldemokratska stranka), a political party in Serbia
 Students for a Democratic Society, US, 1960
 Students for a Democratic Society (2006 organization), left-wing US student organization
 Society for Disability Studies

Other organizations
 Serbian State Guard (Srpska Državna Straža), 1942 to 1944
 Scottish Disability Sport; see Scottish Disability Sports Hall of Fame
 Society of the Divine Savior, a Catholic order founded in 1881
 Social and Decision Sciences (Carnegie Mellon University)
 Spartanburg Day School, Spartanburg, South Carolina, US
 Special Demonstration Squad, of the Metropolitan Police, London
 Studio Distribution Services, a subsidiary of Universal Pictures Home Entertainment

Science and medicine
 Safety data sheet, on chemicals
 Sodium dodecyl sulfate, a synthetic organic compound
 SDS-PAGE, sodium dodecyl sulfate polyacrylamide gel electrophoresis 
 Shwachman–Diamond syndrome, a congenital disorder
 Sudden death syndrome, a soybean disease

Technology
 Satellite Data System, US military communications satellites
 Self Driving System, a technology kit required to convert a manual car into an autonomous car; see List of self-driving system suppliers
 Short data services, in Terrestrial Trunked Radio 
 Slotted Drive Shaft, a special shank on a hammer drill bit; see 
 Software-defined storage, a marketing term for data storage
 Special Direct System, a drill bit fixing system
 Spoken dialog systems, technology allowing machines to converse with humans based on human voice and language

Other uses
 Self-Directed Search, a measure of vocational interest by John L. Holland
 Sened language (ISO 639-3 language code)
 Special Delivery Service, in the UK Postman Pat TV series
 "S.D.S." (song), by Mac Miller
 The Seven Deadly Sins (manga), Japanese manga and animated series
 SDS, sister station of SES (TV station)
 Sado Airport, Japan, IATA airport code